Martyn Alexander Corrigan (born 14 August 1977) is a Scottish former professional football player and manager.

His playing career saw spells at Falkirk, Jokerit, Motherwell, Dundee, Kilmarnock, Ross County, Partick Thistle, Stirling Albion and Stenhousemuir. Corrigan was then manager of Stenhousemuir for 18 months.

Playing career
Corrigan started his career with Falkirk. He then played in Finland for Jokerit, with whom he won the Finnish Cup in 1999, before rejoining Falkirk in 2000.

Weeks later, Corrigan signed for Motherwell. Naturally a right back, Corrigan can play as a centre back or in midfield. In the 2002–03 season he played all but the final 16 minutes of the last game of the season against Livingston. He became a fans favourite, earning the nickname "Kaiser".

Corrigan signed a new three-year contract in 2006, despite suffering a cruciate ligament injury during Motherwell's final match of the 2005–06 season against Dundee United. After the arrival of Mark McGhee as manager, however, Corrigan was selected less frequently.

After a loan spell at Dundee in October 2007, Corrigan moved to Kilmarnock on 5 January 2008. He was released by Motherwell and made his debut for Kilmarnock later that day against Hearts.

At the end of the January 2009 transfer window, he moved down a division to join First Division Ross County. He then moved to Partick Thistle at the beginning of the 2009–10 season, but was released at the end of the season. He then joined Stirling Albion for the 2010–11 campaign.

International
Corrigan made 2 appearances for Scotland B.

Coaching career
In May 2011 he rejected a new contract offered by Stirling Albion, opting instead to join Stenhousemuir as player coach. Corrigan was appointed Stenhousemuir manager in July 2012, replacing Davie Irons. He left the club in January 2014.

Corrigan was appointed assistant manager of Stirling Albion in November 2014, working alongside manager Stuart McLaren. After McLaren was sacked in September 2016, Corrigan was given the role of caretaker manager by the Binos, taking charge of the side until a permanent replacement was found, however he left this role in November 2016, without a new manager having been appointed.

Managerial statistics

References

External links

1977 births
Association football defenders
Dundee F.C. players
Expatriate footballers in Finland
Falkirk F.C. players
FC Jokerit players
Kilmarnock F.C. players
Living people
Motherwell F.C. players
Partick Thistle F.C. players
Ross County F.C. players
Scotland B international footballers
Scottish expatriate footballers
Scottish Football League managers
Scottish Football League players
Scottish football managers
Scottish footballers
Scottish Professional Football League managers
Scottish Premier League players
Footballers from Glasgow
Stenhousemuir F.C. managers
Stenhousemuir F.C. players
Stirling Albion F.C. managers
Stirling Albion F.C. players
Veikkausliiga players